The Cathedral of Saint Joseph of Wheeling or Saint Joseph's Cathedral is the seat of the bishop of the Catholic Diocese of Wheeling-Charleston. In addition to being the seat of the bishop, the cathedral is home to the oldest congregation in the city of Wheeling, West Virginia.  The cathedral is a contributing property to the East Wheeling Historic District on the National Register of Historic Places.

The current pastor of the cathedral is the bishop of the Diocese of Wheeling-Charleston, the Most Reverend Mark E. Brennan.  The current priest in residence is Father Justin Golna.

History
The Cathedral of Saint Joseph is home to Wheeling's oldest Catholic parish, dating to 1822 and Mother Church to the city's other parishes. It has been the liturgical heart of the Diocese of Wheeling (originally) since the diocese's erection by Pope Pius IX in 1850 and is an architectural and artistic treasure in both the city and state. The name cathedral derives from the church which houses the bishop's cathedra or official seat of teaching and governing authority.

In 1847, the cathedral was moved from its former location further south to the corner of Eoff and 13th Street, and the church was titled to Saint James the Apostle. The cathedral rectory still recalls this name in some of its decorations, the St. James’ pilgrim shell clearly repeating throughout the first floor of the building. In 1850, St. James became the cathedral of the diocese, with Bishop Richard V. Whelan as the first bishop of Wheeling.

In 1872, in response to the rising devotion to Saint Joseph, Husband of Mary throughout the universal Church and the burgeoning labor movement among the Catholics of the coal fields, Bishop Whelan petitioned Rome to change the title of the cathedral to honor Saint Joseph.

Bishop Patrick Donahue became Bishop of Wheeling in 1894. Monsignor Thomas Quirk records in his journal, after returning from the Consecration at Wheeling, that there “was much talk about a new Cathedral.” However, it seems that planning did not begin in earnest until after the Great War. Bishop Donahue conceived a design and began to interview possible architects, eyeing Edward J. Weber of Pittsburgh, a rising star in Church architecture, as a likely candidate. Bishop Donahue's death in October 1922, before work had even begun may have scuttled all plans, were it not for a serendipitous fire in 1923 that did significant damage to the cathedral structure.

The fire cleared the way for Bishop Swint, the fourth bishop of Wheeling, to begin the construction of the new cathedral, with the help of Weber and a team of artisans. In three short years, the new cathedral was completed and church was dedicated on April 21, 1926. Bishop Swint commented that he had “planned to build not for a few years, for fifty years or a hundred years, but to erect a building that would stand for hundreds of years and be a beautiful legacy which the present congregation would bequeath to future generations” (West Virginia Register 12/30/22).

The building was designed by Edward Weber and in the Neo-Romanesque style. It cost about $500,000 to build in 1926, .

The present building was dedicated by Bishop John Joseph Swint in April 1926. The building is successor to the original cathedral, which was constructed in 1847.

In 1973, the church was renovated in order to comply with the post-Vatican II liturgy. In this renovation the altar was moved forward and various other changes were made.

Architecture
The cathedral is a Lombardi Romanesque structure with a modified basilica floor plan that is cruciform in shape. Two turrets flank a rose window on the main facade and contribute to the fortress-like character of the building.

Design inspiration came from several churches in Italy, namely, the church of San Pietro in Toscanella and the cathedral in Prato, near Florence. Bishop Swint wanted the dome to be based on the dome of the cathedral of Santa Maria del Fiore in Florence, Italy. The sculpture in the tympanum of the main doorway, depicting "Christ in Majesty", was carved by Francis Aretz, who also sculpted the Stations of the Cross inside. Carved symbols of the Four Evangelists occupy quadrants around the wheel window, as in the Toscanella church, and a statue of St. Joseph stands above. The exterior pulpit and sounding board, both of stone, on the northeast corner of the facade derive from examples such as the cathedral in Prato, near Florence.  A belfry tower at the southeast corner, between transept and apse, is not visible from the street, but can be seen from the courtyard adjacent to the cathedral.

According to the architect, the colorful interior of St. Joseph was created in the Mediaeval Byzantine style. The primary dome is filled with a depiction of heaven. The eye-catching mural, “Enthroned Christ and the Communion of the Saints,” which fills the half-dome of the apse, was painted by Felix B. Lieftuchter, and George W. Sotter designed the medieval-style stained glass. The long, broad nave is covered with a barrel vault decorated with colorfully painted trompe l'oeil coffers. A free-standing ciborium, another feature typical of Lombard Romanesque churches, protects the marble high altar on which the tabernacle rests.

In 1973, changes were made to the interior in keeping with Vatican II standards, and in 1995–1996, the cathedral was restored and cleaned, including the murals and stained glass. A new pulpit, altar, lectern and font designed by Tracy R. Stephens were added.

In 1973, Bishop Joseph Hodges, the fifth Bishop of Wheeling (later, Wheeling-Charleston) oversaw renovations made to the liturgical space according to the norms set by the Second Vatican Council: the main altar was brought forward and centered under the dome, the original ambo (pulpit) and communion rail were removed, and side pews were reoriented to face the central altar.

Bishop Bernard W. Schmitt, the seventh Bishop of Wheeling-Charleston, undertook extensive renovations and restorations to repair the building's interior finishes and adapt the interior to contemporary liturgical needs. This project included: cleaning and conservation of murals and restoration of the painting of the interior; construction of liturgical furnishings to match original woodwork; installation of handicapped accessibility throughout the interior and exterior; new heating, cooling, electrical, lighting, and sound systems; construction of new baptismal fountain; restoration of floor tile and slate on altar platforms, refinishing floor under the pews; and construction of an addition with a kitchen and restrooms, and restoration of courtyard. This period of restoration was completed in 1996.

A new period of restoration and renovations began in 2006 under the leadership of Bishop Michael J. Bransfield, with the extensive works being carried out on the church's roof and external windows, to provide a watertight structure, as well as to the original furnishings of the upper sanctuary, allowing the original cathedra to be restored to liturgical use. A restoration of the stained glass throughout the cathedral has been ongoing for the last seven years in addition to smaller restorations of the side altars and church furnishings. In 2012, important works were carried out in the sanctuary, installing a new marble floor, altar, and ambo designed in a language and materials drawn from the original high altar, designed by Mr. Weber, as well as restoring the pews throughout the church. At the same time, Mr. Weber's inscription, in the church's main portico, was restored.

The adjacent rectory is a three-story, five-bay house that was built in the Gothic revival style in 1920.  It is a brick structure that is built on a stone foundation and capped with a mansard roof with dormers.  Plain brackets are located under the eaves.  The wood carved double entrance way is flanked by columns that are capped with decorative stone carvings.  The third floor features Gothic-arched tracery windows and a balcony with decorative stonework.

In 2011, the diocese initiated a major reorganization project for the campus of the cathedral, where the diocese had outgrown its existing 1950s-era chancery that houses the diocese's administrative offices. The existing campus included numerous buildings serving the area's Catholic community: St. Joseph Cathedral, the chancery, rectory, and archives, as well as a high school and elementary school. Plans for the reorganization included closing the existing elementary school due to low enrollment and renovating the building into a new chancery. This reorganization also involved the construction of landscape elements that would connect the old and new areas of the site and create enduring public spaces. These included the development of a community central courtyard and a garden dedicated to the Virgin Mary, adding to the sense of place and worship. A new fountain in the courtyard adds elements of movement and sound, creating an inviting and serene gathering area.

See also
List of Catholic cathedrals in the United States
List of cathedrals in the United States
Cathedral Parish School

Notes

External links

 Official Cathedral Site
Roman Catholic Diocese of Wheeling-Charleston Official Site

Landmarks in West Virginia
Joseph of Wheeling, Cathedral of
Buildings and structures in Wheeling, West Virginia
Romanesque Revival church buildings in West Virginia
Church buildings with domes
Roman Catholic churches completed in 1926
Churches in the Roman Catholic Diocese of Wheeling-Charleston
Historic district contributing properties in West Virginia
National Register of Historic Places in Ohio County, West Virginia
Churches on the National Register of Historic Places in West Virginia
20th-century Roman Catholic church buildings in the United States